Morbid Visions is the debut studio album by Brazilian metal band Sepultura, released on November 10, 1986, by Cogumelo Records. While later albums have a more political edge, Morbid Visions (along with the 1985 EP Bestial Devastation) is notable for Satanic themes and imagery. The band said many lyrics were fashioned after those of early extreme metal bands such as Venom and Celtic Frost (note the similarity of the album title to Morbid Tales).

The production quality of the album is rather poor. In the liner notes of Roadrunner's reissue of the album (which includes the tracks from Bestial Devastation), Cavalera admits that the band neglected to tune their guitars during the recording. They were only starting to learn English at this point, so they had to translate the lyrics word-for-word using a dictionary. All pre-1992 releases of Morbid Visions featured the first movement of Carl Orff's Carmina Burana ("O Fortuna") as an unnamed introduction. This composition was left off the CD re-release, probably due to copyright issues.  This would mark the last appearance of the group's original lead guitarist Jairo Guedz.

Track listing

Personnel
Max Cavalera – vocals, rhythm guitar, bass
Igor Cavalera – drums, percussion
Jairo Guedz – lead guitar, bass (uncredited)
Paulo Jr. – bass (credited, but did not perform)

Notes

References
 Barcinski, André & Gomes, Silvio (1999). Sepultura: Toda a História. São Paulo: Ed. 34. 
 Sepultura (1986). Morbid Visions. [CD]. New York, NY: Roadrunner Records. The Sepultura Remasters (1997).
 Sepultura (1986). Morbid Visions. [Vinyl]. Belo Horizonte, MG: Cogumelo Produções.

1986 debut albums
Sepultura albums
Black metal albums by Brazilian artists